Dimorphocoris is a genus of true bugs belonging to the family Miridae.

The species of this genus are found in Europe.

Species:
 Dimorphocoris abutilon Wagner, 1966 
 Dimorphocoris albipilis Kerzhner, 1964

References

Miridae